Droizy is a commune in the Aisne department in Hauts-de-France in northern France, near Soissons. It was the site of the Battle of Droizy in 593. Paul Girod, mayor of Droizy from 1958 until his death in 2021, was the longest-serving mayor in France, having been in office for 63 years.

Population

See also
Communes of the Aisne department

References

Communes of Aisne
Aisne communes articles needing translation from French Wikipedia